Antonio Soller (10 August 1840, Lisboa; - ?) was a Portuguese pianist and composer.

He studied painting and music. Later, he lived in France, Italy and Belgium, and in 1884, he dedicated a march titled Heroism to King Humbert. He composed various triumphal and funeral marches.

Autograph letters from Antonio Soller to Charles Malherbe survive from 1902, placing his date of death in the 20th century, but at present his exact date of death is unknown to scholarship

Selected works
L'etoíle d'Espagne, tanda de valses
Chant des oisseaux
La source, capricho brillante
Los cloches de Westminster, nocturno
Tarantela
Polonesa
Scherzo
Sinfonia à Gran Orquesta
Souvenir d'Alsace
A vivandeira, operetta

References

Enciclopedia Universal Espasa Calpe.

Portuguese classical composers
Year of death unknown 
1840 births
19th-century Portuguese people
People from Lisbon
Portuguese expatriates in France
Portuguese expatriates in Belgium
Portuguese expatriates in Italy